Simple Modern Answers is the first solo album by BBMak member Christian Burns, released on 25 October 2013. It features collaborations with electronic musicians such as Armin van Buuren, Paul van Dyk, BT, and others.

Track listing

References

2013 debut albums
Christian Burns albums
Armada Music albums